Dan Stanca (Bucharest, September 30, 1955) is a Romanian writer.

Life
He studied English literature at the University of Bucharest and worked as a journalist for the cultural magazine România Liberă until 2008.

Works
Vântul sau țipătul altuia, 1992
Aripile arhanghelului Mihail, 1996
Apocalips amânat, 1997
 Ultima biserica, 1997
Ritualul noptii, 1998
Morminte străvezii, 1999
Ultimul om, 1999
Pasarea orbilor,2001
Drumul spre piatră, 2002
Mila frunzelor,2003
A doua zi după moarte, 2003
Mut, 2006
Noaptea lui Iuda, 2007
 Cei calzi si cei reci , 2008
 Mutilare ,2010
 A doua zi dupa moarte ,2011
 Craii si mortii ,2012
Mare amară, 2014
Ghetsimani '51, 2015
 Anii frigului , 2017

Prizes
 Uniunii Scriitorilor din România, 2015, „Ghetsimani ’51” (Editura Cartea Românească).

References and external links 

1955 births
Living people
University of Bucharest alumni 
Romanian journalists
20th-century Romanian writers
21st-century Romanian writers
Writers from Bucharest